Natural Resources Canada's (NRCan's) ecoENERGY retrofit program provides financial support to homeowners, small and medium-sized businesses, public institutions and industrial facilities to help them implement energy saving projects that reduce energy-related greenhouse gases (GHGs) and air pollution.

There was originally a residential program, and a business program. Natural Resources Canada's Office of Energy Efficiency is no longer offering the ecoENERGY Retrofit Incentive for Buildings, the commercial/institutional component of the ecoENERGY Retrofit financial incentives for existing homes, buildings and industrial processes.

The business program ended on June 6, 2012.

See also
EnerGuide for New Houses
EnerGuide
EnerGuide for Houses

External links
ecoENERGY Initiative
ecoENERGY Retrofit - Homes Program 
Natural Resources Canada: Home Retrofit Grant Brochure and Eligibility 
Carbon Dioxide Reduction Edmonton 
Natural Resources Canada: Assessment Ratings Canada
Natural Resources Canada: Office of Energy Efficiency – ecoENERGY Retrofit  

Building
Energy conservation in Canada